Red Mountain, elevation , is a summit in the Culebra Range of south central Colorado.

Historical names
Espinazo Rojo – 1972
Red Mountain – 1972

See also

List of Colorado mountain ranges
List of Colorado mountain summits
List of Colorado fourteeners
List of Colorado 4000 meter prominent summits
List of the most prominent summits of Colorado
List of Colorado county high points

References

External links

Mountains of Colorado
Mountains of Costilla County, Colorado
North American 4000 m summits